Mount Teroken is the highest point on the Micronesian island of Moen in Chuuk State. It rises to a height of 1214 ft (364 m).

References
Bendure, G. & Friary, N. (1988) Micronesia:A travel survival kit. South Yarra, VIC: Lonely Planet.

Mountains of the Federated States of Micronesia
Weno